The 1972 FIM Motocross World Championship was the 16th F.I.M. Motocross Racing World Championship season.

Summary
Roger De Coster won his second consecutive 500cc world championship for Suzuki ahead of East German rider, Paul Friedrichs and Finnish rider Heikki Mikkola. Joël Robert, claimed his sixth 250cc title, and fifth in a row for the Suzuki factory racing team. Yamaha joined the championship fray with former Husqvarna riders Christer Hammargren and Jaak van Velthoven in the 500cc class and Håkan Andersson in the 250cc class.

Grands Prix

500cc

250cc

Final standings

References

External links
 

FIM Motocross World Championship season
Motocross World Championship seasons